Roberto Carlos e o Diamante Cor-de-Rosa is a Brazilian film released in July 1970, directed and produced by Roberto Farias. The film is the second of a trilogy featuring the singer Roberto Carlos; co-starring with him, his Jovem Guarda musical partners Erasmo carlos and Wanderléa. It had an audience of 2,639,174 spectators, being the highest-grossing film in Brazil in 1970.

Plot
The singers Roberto Carlos, Erasmo Carlos and Wanderléa are in Japan, when the latter decides to buy an old statuette. Immediately she and her companions begin to be pursued by Pierre, a mysterious man who leads a gang of oriental fighters. Roberto and Erasmo go to Israel, but they don't meet Wanderléa, who stays in Japan, prisoner of the bandits. In Israel, Roberto and Erasmo intend to return to look for the singer, but at the hotel they receive the statue, mysteriously. Soon after, a samurai genie (whom they call Eugenio) appears, who claims to protect the statue's owners. So they ask the genie to look for Wanderléa, which he does. With the three reunited, they discover an ancient Phoenician treasure map hidden in the statue. They try to decipher the map, but Pierre chases them back. When translating the map, Roberto thinks that the place described is in Brazil, in Guanabara Bay. So the singers go to Rio de Janeiro, still pursued by Pierre.

Cast 
 Teruo Nakatani	
 Roberto Carlos	
 José Lewgoy ... Pierre	
 Erasmo Carlos	
 Wanderléa	
 Paulo Porto

Notes

References

External links 

 Film information at Cinemateca Brasileira

Brazilian adventure films
Films directed by Roberto Farias
1970s Portuguese-language films
Yakuza films
1970s adventure films
Japan in non-Japanese culture